20th Reconnaissance Squadron may refer to:
 The 410th Bombardment Squadron, constituted as the 20th Reconnaissance Squadron (Heavy) in January 1942, but redesignated as a bombardment unit before activation
 The 20th Special Operations Squadron, designated the 20th Reconnaissance Squadron (Fighter) from April 1943 to August 1943
 The 20th Tactical Reconnaissance Squadron, designated the 20th Reconnaissance Squadron, Long Range (Photographic-RCM) from May 1945 to June 1946 and the 20th Reconnaissance Squadron (Night Photographic) from July 1947 to June 1949
 The 20th Attack Squadron, designated the 20th Reconnaissance Squadron from January 2011 to May 2016

See also
 The 20th Strategic Reconnaissance Squadronx
 The 20th Tactical Reconnaissance Squadron, active from August 1943 to November 1945
 The 20th Tactical Reconnaissance Squadron, active from March 1954 to November 1967
 20 Squadron (disambiguation)